The Ukimwi Road: From Kenya to Zimbabwe is a book by Irish author Dervla Murphy.
 It was first published by John Murray in 1993. Ukimwi is Swahili for AIDS.

References

External links
 

1993 non-fiction books
John Murray (publishing house) books
Books by Dervla Murphy